URA is an acronym which may refer to:

The IATA code for Oral Ak Zhol Airport in Kazakhstan
The IPAsTA code for Herschel Orbital Cosmodrome, Uranus
, a Russian news site
Uganda Revenue Authority
Uganda Revenue Authority SC, a Kampala football club
Unió de Radioaficionats Andorrans, an amateur radio organization in Andorra
United Red Army, a revolutionary group in Japan
Universities Research Association
Urban Redevelopment Authority of Singapore
Urban Redevelopment Authority of Pittsburgh
Urban Renewal Authority of Hong Kong
Uniformly Redundant Array, a type of Coded aperture
United Reform Action, a political party in Montenegro

Other use
Ura (dance), a popular traditional dances of the Cook Islands

See also
Ura (disambiguation)